Samuel Gross (November 10, 1776 – March 19, 1839) was an American politician from Pennsylvania who served as a Republican member of the United States House of Representatives for Pennsylvania's 2nd congressional district from 1819 to 1823.

Biography
Born in Upper Providence Township in Montgomery County, Pennsylvania, he engaged in agricultural pursuits. He served as a member of the Pennsylvania House of Representatives 1803–1807; served in the Pennsylvania State Senate 1811–1815; was elected as a Republican to the Sixteenth and Seventeenth Congresses (March 4, 1819 – March 4, 1823). He died in Trappe, Pennsylvania.

References

Biographical Directory of the United States Congress, 1771–Present.

Gross, Samuel (politician)
Gross, Samuel (politician)
Members of the Pennsylvania House of Representatives
Pennsylvania state senators
Democratic-Republican Party members of the United States House of Representatives from Pennsylvania